Andy Mark Sheets (born November 19, 1971) is an American former professional baseball player. Sheets played for the Seattle Mariners (1996–1997), San Diego Padres (1998), Anaheim Angels (1999), Boston Red Sox (2000) and Tampa Bay Devil Rays (2001–2002). And also, he played for the Hiroshima Toyo Carp (2003–2004), and Hanshin Tigers (2005–2007), of the Nippon Professional Baseball (NPB).

He is the cousin of pitcher Ben Sheets. Instead of Tom O'Malley, he scouts players in the major and minor league for the Hanshin Tigers.

Playing career
A native of Baton Rouge, Louisiana, Sheets attended Tulane University and Louisiana State University. In 1991, he played collegiate summer baseball with the Brewster Whitecaps of the Cape Cod Baseball League. He was selected by the Mariners in the 4th round of the 1992 MLB Draft.

Sheets helped the Mariners win the 1997 American League Western Division and the Padres win the 1998 National League Pennant. In 7 seasons, he played in 356 games and had 960 at bats, 118 runs, 207 hits, 38 doubles, 3 triples, 19 home runs, 113 runs batted in, 16 stolen bases, 76 walks, a .216 batting average, a .271 on-base percentage, a .321 slugging percentage, 308 total bases, 23 sacrifice hits, 12 sacrifice flies, and 3 intentional walks.

Career Stats

References

External links

1971 births
Living people
American expatriate baseball players in Canada
American expatriate baseball players in Japan
Anaheim Angels players
Appleton Foxes players
Baseball players from Baton Rouge, Louisiana
Boston Red Sox players
Brewster Whitecaps players
Edmonton Trappers players
Hanshin Tigers players
Hiroshima Toyo Carp players
Jacksonville Suns players
LSU Tigers baseball players
Major League Baseball shortstops
Nippon Professional Baseball first basemen
Nippon Professional Baseball shortstops
Riverside Pilots players
San Diego Padres players
Seattle Mariners players
Tacoma Rainiers players
Tampa Bay Devil Rays players
Tulane Green Wave baseball players